The Acid Elephant is an EP from the Welsh stoner rock/doom band Acrimony. It was released in 1995 on Godhead Recordings. It contains four songs, two of which were on their previous album Hymns to the Stone and two of which would be re-recorded for their next album Tumuli Shroomaroom. "Spaced Cat #7" is a remix of "Spaced Cat #6" with the addition of a Hammond organ and the sound of someone smoking a bong.

Track listing
All music written by Stuart O'Hara, Darren Ivey, Lee Davies and Paul Bidmead; all lyrics written by Dorian Walters.
 "Spaced Cat #7" (Hammond Moon – Bong mix) – 7:06    
 "The Inn" – 4:34    
 "The Bud Song" – 5:05
 "Fire–Dance" (Live from Planet Urabalaboom) – 8:18

Personnel
Dorian Walters – vocals
Lee Davies – lead and rhythm guitars
Stuart O'Hara – lead and rhythm guitars
Paul Bidmead – bass
Darren Ivey – drums, percussion

References

External links
"The Acid Elephant E.P." at discogs

1995 EPs
Acrimony albums